The name Labuyo has been used for four tropical cyclones in the Philippines by the PAGASA in the Western Pacific Ocean. It was a given local name which derived from a kind of chili pepper plant.

 Typhoon Lekima (2001) (T0119, 23W, Labuyo)  – made landfall on Taiwan.
 Typhoon Damrey (2005) (T0518, 17W, Labuyo) – made landfall on Hainan, and later in Vietnam.
 Tropical Storm Dujuan (2009) (T0912, 13W, Labuyo) – remained out in the open ocean.
 Typhoon Utor (2013) (T1311, 11W, Labuyo) – powerful typhoon that made landfall on Luzon, in the Philippines, and later in Guangdong, China.

The name Labuyo was retired after the 2013 typhoon season and replaced with Lannie.

Pacific typhoon set index articles